Lenore Lake is a partly saline lake in the province of Saskatchewan, Canada. It is part of the Lenore Lake Basin, which includes several saline lakes (Basin, Middle, Frog, Ranch, Murphy, Flat, Mantrap, Houghton, Deadmoose and Waldsea) as well as the freshwater St. Brieux Lake and Burton Lake.  The basin has no natural outlet. Lenore Lake was designated a migratory bird sanctuary in 1925 and sustains a habitat for walleye, whitefish, perch and northern pike.

Environmental concerns
In recent years, water levels in the basin have risen to historic levels. Nearby Houghton Lake, a highly saline body of water, has drained water into Lenore Lake. To prevent the highly saline water from damaging the fish habitat in Lenore Lake, Environment Canada ordered the permanent closure of a culvert between the two lakes on May 10, 2010.

In 2009, Saskatchewan's Ministry of the Environment issued fish consumption guidelines for walleye and northern pike taken from Lenore Lake, due to the level of mercury detected in the fish.

See also
List of lakes of Saskatchewan

References

Lakes of Saskatchewan
Saline lakes of Canada
Three Lakes No. 400, Saskatchewan
Lake Lenore No. 399, Saskatchewan
Division No. 15, Saskatchewan